Taj Boyuk (also Romanized as Tāj Boyūk; also known as Tājībeyūk, Tājī Boūk and Tājī Boyūk) is a village in Mehmandust Rural District, Kuraim District, Nir County, Ardabil Province, Iran. At the 2006 census, its population was 66, in 12 families.

References 

Towns and villages in Nir County